USS Hopkins (SP-3294) was a United States Navy patrol vessel in commission from 1918 to 1920.  She was the second of three Navy vessels named in honor of Commodore of the Continental Navy Esek Hopkins.

History 
Hopkins was built as a commercial fishing boat for the Hopkins Fish and Oyster Company of Norfolk, Virginia, in 1917 by the Hahnes Company at Portsmouth, Virginia; she was both launched and completed that year.

The 5th Naval District inspected her at Norfolk on 20 August 1918 for possible naval service, and on 1 September 1918 was purchased by the U.S. Navy for use as a section patrol boat during World War I. She was commissioned on 3 October 1918 as USS Hopkins (SP-3294).

Assigned to the 5th Naval District, Hopkins performed harbor patrol and other harbor duties at Norfolk.  She was transferred to the United States Department of War on 4 March 1920.

Notes

References 

Department of the Navy Naval History and Heritage Command Online Library of Selected Images: Civilian Ships: Fishing boat Hopkins (1917–1918); Served as USS Hopkins (ID # 3294), 1918–1920.
NavSource Online: Section Patrol Craft Photo Archive Hopkins (SP 3294)

Patrol vessels of the United States Navy
World War I patrol vessels of the United States
Ships built in Portsmouth, Virginia
1917 ships